The Formaciones de Tepuyes Natural Monument also known as tepui Also Formaciones de Tepuyes Is a protected natural space since 1991, located in Venezuela more specifically in the states of Amazonas and Bolívar. Should not be confused with the Canaima national park that contains part of the tepuyes.

The total area reaches 1,069,820 hectares of forest formations where mountain formations are known as tepuy (tepui). The tepuys are rock formations with flat peaks and vertical escarpments. Tepuys are residual forms of the Guayana Massif, constituted by sandstones, quartzites and granites of the pre-Inca era, with intrusions of dia- bric rocks. Ecosystems with endemic species have been developed at their summits and on their slopes.

In the state of Bolívar there are twelve protected tepuy formations as a natural monument, while in the state of Amazonas thirteen have been selected. The criteria for its choice were the configuration, the scenic beauty and its abundant biodiversity.

In the state of Bolívar, Uei Tepuy (2,150 m), Kukenan Tepuy (2,650 m), Yuruani Tepuy (2,400 m), Karaurín Tepuy (2,500 m) and Ilú Tepuy (2,700 m).

The most outstanding of the state of Amazonas are the Cerro Yaví (2,300 m), the Parú Euaja massif (2,200 m) and the Cerro Tamacuari  (2,300 m).

Gallery

See also
Gran Sabana
Canaima National Park

References

Natural monuments of Venezuela
Protected areas established in 1991
Tepuis of Venezuela